This article contains information about the literary events and publications of 1602.

Events
February 2 – The Lord Chamberlain's Men perform Twelfth Night at the Middle Temple in London.
May – Henry Wotton returns to Florence having disclosed a plot to murder King James VI of Scotland.
May 4 – Richard Hakluyt is installed as prebendary of Westminster Abbey.
November 8 – The Bodleian Library at the University of Oxford opens to scholars.
November 22 – Samuel Rowley and William Bird(e) (or Borne) are paid by the Admiral's Men for additions to Christopher Marlowe's play Doctor Faustus.

New books

Prose
Tommaso Campanella – The City of the Sun (a philosophical work, one of the most important utopias)
Thomas Campion – Observations in the Art of English Poetry
Richard Carew – A Survey of Cornwall
Cipriano de Valera (rev.) – 'Reina-Valera' (Spanish translation of the Bible)
Sir Hugh Plat – Delightes for Ladies (book of recipes and household hints)

Drama
Anonymous – A Larum for London, or The Siedge of Antwerpe with the  actes and valorous deeds of the lame soldier published
Henry Chettle – Hoffmann
John Davies of Hereford – Mirum in Modum
Thomas Dekker (with Thomas Middleton?) – Blurt, Master Constable, or The Spaniards Night-Walke published
Ben Jonson – The Poetaster published
Sir David Lyndsay (died c. 1555) – Humanity and Sensuality and A Satire of the Three Estates published
John Marston – Antonio and Mellida published
William Shakespeare – Hamlet performed (latest date), The Merry Wives of Windsor published, Troilus and Cressida probable completion date
"W.S." – Thomas Lord Cromwell published

Poetry

Giambattista Marino – Le Rime
Cristóbal de Virués – El Monserrate segundo

Births
March 29 – John Lightfoot, English theologian (died 1675)
April 30 – Robert Baillie, Scottish divine and historian (died 1662)
May 2 – Athanasius Kircher, German scholar (died 1680)
May 10 – Samuel Newman, American Biblical commentator (died 1663)
October or November – Dudley North, English poet, writer and politician (died 1677)
Unknown date – Juan Pérez de Montalbán, Spanish dramatist and poet (died 1638)
Approximate year – Owen Feltham, English essayist (died 1668)

Deaths
February 13 – Alexander Nowell, English theologian (born c. 1507)
September 14 – Jean Passerat, French poet and satirist (born 1534)
October 13 – Franciscus Junius (the elder), Swiss theologian (born 1545)
October 30 – Jean-Jacques Boissard, French poet (born 1528)
Unknown date – Jean Pithou, French legal writer (born 1534)

References

 
Years of the 17th century in literature